The Someone to Watch Award, sponsored by Kiehl's, recognizes a talented filmmaker of singular vision who has not yet received appropriate recognition.

History
The award includes a $25,000 unrestricted grant. The award was first given at the 1994 award ceremony.

Notable winners/nominees who would soon become recognized include Kelly Reichardt (Wendy and Lucy), Chris Smith (American Movie), Tim Blake Nelson (The Grey Zone), Marc Forster (Finding Neverland), Andrew Bujalski (Mutual Appreciation), Ramin Bahrani (Fahrenheit 451) & Barry Jenkins (Moonlight)

Winners

1990s 
 1994: Lodge Kerrigan –  Clean, Shaven
 1995: Christopher Münch – Color of a Brisk and Leaping Day
Tim McCann – Desolation Angels
Jennifer Montgomery – Art for Teachers of Children
Kelly Reichardt – River of Grass
Rafal Zielinski – Fun
 1996: Larry Fessenden – Habit
Joe Brewster – The Keeper
Chris Smith – American Job
 1997: Scott Saunders – The Headhunter's Sister
Erin Dignam – Loved
Tim Blake Nelson – Eye of God
 1998: David D. Williams – Thirteen
Tony Barbieri – One
Lynn Hershman Leeson – Conceiving Ada
Eric Tretbar – Snow
 1999: Cauleen Smith – Drylongso
 Dan Clark – The Item
 Julian Goldberger – Trans
 Lisanne Skyler – Getting to Know You

2000s 
 2000: Marc Forster – Everything Put Together
Dan McCormack – Other Voices
Mia Trachinger – Bunny
 2001: Debra Eisenstadt – Daydream Believer
DeMane Davis and Khari Streeter – Lift
Michael Gilio – Kwik Stop
David Maquiling – Too Much Sleep
 2002: Przemyslaw Reut – Paradox Lake
Eric Eason – Manito
Eitan Gorlin – The Holy Land
 2003: Andrew Bujalski – Funny Ha Ha
Ben Coccio – Zero Day
Ryan Eslinger – Madness and Genius
 2004: Jem Cohen – Chain
Bryan Poyser – Dear Pillow
Jennifer Reeves – The Time We Killed
 2005: Ian Gamazon and Neill Dela Llana – Cavite
Robinson Devor – Police Beat
Jay Duplass – The Puffy Chair
 2006: Julia Loktev – Day Night Day Night
So Yong Kim – In Between Days
Richard Wong – Colma: The Musical
 2007: Ramin Bahrani – Chop Shop
Ronald Bronstein – Frownland
Lee Isaac Chung – Munyurangabo
 2008: Lynn Shelton – My Effortless Brilliance
Barry Jenkins – Medicine for Melancholy
Nina Paley – Sita Sings the Blues
 2009: Kyle Patrick Alvarez – Easier with Practice
Asiel Norton – Redland
Tariq Tapa – Zero Bridge

2010s 
 2010: Mike Ott – Littlerock
Hossein Keshavarz – Dog Sweat
Laurel Nakadate – The Wolf Knife
 2011: Mark Jackson – Without
Simon Arthur – Silver Tongues
Nicholas Ozeki – Mamitas
 2012: Adam Leon – Gimme the Loot
David Fenster – Pincus
Rebecca Thomas – Electrick Children
 2013: Shaka King – NewlyweedsMadeline Olnek – The Foxy Merkins 
Aaron Douglas Johnston – My Sister's Quinceañera 
 2014:  Rania Attieh and Daniel Garcia – H. Ana Lily Amirpour –  A Girl Walks Home Alone at Night Chris Eska – The Retrieval 
 2015: Felix Thompson – King Jack
Robert Machoian and Rodrigo Ojeda-Beck – God Bless the ChildChloé Zhao – Songs My Brothers Taught Me 2016: Anna Rose Holmer – The Fits
Andrew Ahn – Spa NightClaire Carré – EmbersIngrid Jungermann – Women Who Kill2017: Justin Chon — Gook
Amman Abbasi — DayveonKevin Phillips — Super Dark Times2018: Alexandre Moratto — Sócrates
Ioana Uricaru — LemonadeJeremiah Zagar — We the Animals2019: Rashaad Ernesto Green — Premature
Ash Mayfair — The Third WifeJoe Talbot —  The Last Black Man in San Francisco''

References

Independent Spirit Awards
Film directing awards
Awards established in 1994